Unión Huayllaspanca was a Peruvian football club, playing in the city of Huancayo, Junín, Peru.

History
Unión Huayllaspanca participated in the Peruvian Primera División in the 1990 Torneo Descentralizado and 1991 Torneo Descentralizado. 

The club won the 1991 Central Zone group and classified to the Regional I's octagonal, but was eliminated by Universitario.

See also
List of football clubs in Peru
Peruvian football league system

External links
 Peruvian First Division

Football clubs in Peru